Barsa may refer to:

Places
Barsa, Burkina Faso
Bârsa (disambiguation)
Bârsa, a commune in Arad County, Romania
Barsa, Lebanon, a village in Koura District
Barsa, Idlib, a village in Idlib, Syria
Mount Barsa, a mountain in Syria
 Barsa Subdivision, a former local service district annexed by the town of Rothesay, New Brunswick in 1998

Other uses
Barsa (encyclopedia)
Barsa (film), a Tulu language film of 2016
Barsa (novel), a 2008 Indian novel written by Khadeeja Mumtaz
Odette Barsa (1901–1975), American lingerie designer

See also

 Basra (disambiguation)
 Barsakelmes (disambiguation) including Barsa-Kelmes